Richards is a common Celtic Welsh, or Cornish surname based on the English version of the parent's name ending in -S. In 1881 people with this surname were mainly located in Wales, Cornwall and adjacent South-West counties of England. By 1998 many Welsh and Cornish people had migrated to cities in England particularly those adjacent to these areas.

A
Aaron Richards, vocalist for the label Monstercat
Ahmmon Richards (born 1998), American football player
Alan Richards (born 1958), Royal Navy Vice Admiral and Chief of Defence Intelligence
Albert Richards (disambiguation), several people, including:
Albert G. Richards, (1917–2008), American photographer and scientist
Albert Norton Richards, (1821–1897), Canadian politician
Albert Richards (artist), (1919–1945), British war artist
Alfred Richards (disambiguation), several people, including:
Alfred Bate Richards (1820–1876), English journalist and author
Alfred Joseph Richards (1879–1953), British soldier
Alfred Newton Richards (1876–1966), American pharmacologist
Alfred Richards (sportsman) (1867–1904), South African cricketer
Alden Richards (born 1992), Filipino Actor and Host Kapuso
Alma Richards (1890–1963), American athlete
Alun Richards (1929–2001), Welsh novelist
Amy Richards (born 1971), American activist, writer, feminist and art historian
Angela Richards (born 1944), British actress
Ann Richards (actress) (1917–2006), Australian actress
Ann Richards (singer) (1935–1982), American jazz singer
Ann Richards (1933–2006), American politician, 45th Governor of Texas
Anna Richards (born 1964), New Zealand rugby union international
Anthony Charles Richards, British Army officer and equerry
Ariana Richards, American actress
J. August Richards, American actor

B
Barry Richards, "Dancing Barry" dancer at basketball games
Barry Richards (cricketer), South African cricketer
Beah Richards, American actress and writer
Beresford Richards, Canadian politician
Bernard Richards, British computer scientist
Billie Mae Richards, Canadian voice actress
Bob Richards, American athlete, double Olympic Gold Medalist
Brad Richards, Canadian ice-hockey player
Brandon Richards, former National High School Record holder in pole vault, son of Bob Richards
Brooke Richards, American model

C
Charles Richards (disambiguation), several people, including:
Charles Dow Richards, Canadian politician
Charles Foster Richards (1866–1944), American philatelist
Claire Richards, British singer
Cliff Richards, Brazilian–American comic book artist
Colin Kazim-Richards, English footballer
Corey Richards, Australian cricketer
Craig Richards (disambiguation), several people

D
Davey Richards, American wrestler
David Richards (disambiguation), several people, including:
David Adams Richards, Canadian writer
Dean Richards (footballer), English footballer
Dean Richards (rugby player), English rugby union international
DeForest Richards, American banker and politician
Deke Richards, American songwriter and music producer
Deleon Richards, American gospel singer
Denis Richards, British historian
Denise Richards, American actress
Dick Richards (disambiguation), several people
Dickinson W. Richards, American physiologist
Dig Richards (1940–1983), Australian rock and roll singer
Donna Richards, pseudonym of American comics artist Don Rico
Dylan Richards, American software developer

E
Ellen Swallow Richards (1842–1911), American chemist
Emil Richards (1932–2019), American percussionist
Emma Richards (minister) (1927–2014), American Mennonite minister
Emma Richards (yachtswoman), British yachtswoman
Erin Richards (born 1986), British actress
Eugene Richards (born 1944), American documentary photographer

F
Fannie M. Richards (1840–1922), American educator
Frances Richards (British artist) (1903–1985), British artist
Francis Richards (sailor) (1873–1955), British Olympic sailor
Francis Richards (diplomat) (born 1945), former governor of Gibraltar
Frank Richards (disambiguation), one of several people, including:
Frank "Cannonball" Richards, performance artist
Frank Richards, pseudonym of Hungarian sociologist Frank Furedi
Frank Richards, pseudonym of Charles Hamilton (writer), Billy Bunter stories
Frank Richards, pseudonym of Francis Philip Woodruff (1883–1961), who wrote Old Soldiers Never Die
Frederick Richards (1833–1912), Royal Navy officer
Frederick Richards (disambiguation)
Frederick Richards (film editor), American film editor
 Frederic M. Richards (1925–2009), professor of biochemistry at Yale University
 Fred Richards (baseball) (1927–2016), American baseball player
 Frederick Richards (1833–1912), admiral of the fleet
 Frederick Richards (film editor) (1903–1949), American film editor
 Frederick Richards (judge) (1869–1957), Australian jurist

G
Garrett Richards (born 1988), American baseball player
Gavin Richards, British actor
Gene Richards (baseball), American baseball player
Gene Richards (racing driver), American race car driver
George Richards (disambiguation), several people, including:
G. E. Richards, Royal Navy hydrographer, son of Sir George
George Franklin Richards (1861–1950), American religious leader
George Henry Richards, (1819–1896) hydrographer to the British Admiralty
George Maxwell Richards (1931–2018), president of Trinidad and Tobago
George Richards (Australian politician) (1865–1915), of New South Wales
George Richards (Marine Corps), Marine Corps Brevet Medal recipient
Glen Richards (motorcyclist), Australian superbike rider
Gordon Richards (jockey), British jockey
Grafton Melville Richards aka Melville Richards (1910–1973), Welsh scholar
Guy Richards (born 1983), Australian rules footballer

H
Henry Brinley Richards, Welsh composer
Henry Melchior Muhlenberg Richards, United States Military Officer
Hilda Muhlhauser Richards, American federal labor official

I
I. A. Richards, British literary critic
Ian Richards (racewalker), British race walker
Irene Richards, New Zealand painter

J
J. Havens Richards, American Jesuit educator
J. Kirk Richards, American artist 
J. R. Richards, American singer
Jack Richards (disambiguation), several people
Janet Radcliffe Richards, British feminist philosopher
Jann Arden Anne Richards, Canadian singer known as Jann Arden
Jason Richards, New Zealand racing driver
Jean Ramjohn-Richards, physician and First Lady of Trinidad and Tobago
Jeff Richards (disambiguation), several people, including:
Jeff Richards (baseball player/actor), American baseball player and actor
Jeff Richards (comedian), American actor, stand-up comedian and impressionist
Jesse Richards, American artist
Jim Richards (disambiguation), several people, including:
Jim Richards (Canadian broadcaster), Canadian radio broadcaster
Jim Richards (race driver), New Zealand and Australian race driver
Jo-Anne Richards South African author and journalist
John Richards (disambiguation), several people, including:
John Inigo Richards, British painter
John K. Richards, American lawyer and politician
John G. Richards, 96th Governor of South Carolina from 1927 to 1931
John Richards (disc jockey), American radio disc jockey 
John Richards (Pennsylvania), United States congressman from Pennsylvania
John Richards (Royal Marines officer), Marshal of the Diplomatic Corps in the Queen's household in the UK
John Richards (scholar), Canadian scholar
Jonelle Richards, New Zealand equestrian
Joseph Richards (disambiguation), several people
Julian C. Richards, British archaeologist and broadcaster
Julian D. Richards, British archaeologist
Justin Richards, British writer

K
Kathleen Elizabeth Richards aka Kathy Hilton, American actress
Keith Richards, British guitarist for The Rolling Stones
Kim Richards, American actress
Kim Richards (politician) (born 1971), Queensland MLA
Kristi Richards, Canadian skier
Kyle Richards, American actress

L
Laura E. Richards, American writer
Lee Greene Richards, American artist 
LeGrand Richards, American LDS (Mormon) leader
Len Richards, Welsh footballer
Lerrone Richards (born 1992), British boxer
Leyton Richards (1859–1948), English Congregational minister and pacifist
Lorenzo A. Richards, American soil physicist
Lorin Morgan-Richards, author/publisher of Welsh descent
Lou Richards (actor), American actor
Lou Richards, Australian rules footballer

M
Marc Richards, English footballer
Mark Richards (disambiguation), several people
Martin Richards (disambiguation), several people
Matt Richards (disambiguation), several people
Matthias Richards, American congressman from Pennsylvania
Melville Richards, aka Grafton Melville Richards, Welsh scholar
Micah Richards, English football player
Michael Richards, American actor
Mike Richards (ice hockey), Canadian ice hockey player

N
Nansi Richards, Welsh harpist
Nathaniel Richards (disambiguation)
Nick Richards (basketball) (born 1997), Jamaican-American basketball player
Nicola Richards, British Member of Parliament elected 2019
Nigel Richards (Scrabble player), Scrabble champion

O
O'Neil Richards (born 1976), Jamaican cricketer
Owain Richards, British entomologist

P
Pat Richards, Australian rugby league player
Patricia D. Richards (born 1947), American photographer
Paul Richards (disambiguation), several people, including:
Paul Richards (baseball), American baseball
Paul W. Richards, American astronaut
Pearl Richards, pseudonym John Oliver Hobbes, American-British novelist
 Peter Richards (disambiguation), several people
 Peter Richards (rugby player), English rugby union player
Peter Richards (artist) (born 1970), artist & curator, Belfast
Peter Richards (Royal Navy officer) (1787–1869), admiral and Third Naval Lord
Peter Richards (physician) (1936–2011), president of Hughes Hall, Cambridge
Peter Felix Richards (1808–1868), Scottish merchant in Shanghai
Pete Richards (American football) (1905–1989), American football player

R
Rabbit Richards, American poet
Ralph Richards (1809–1883), New York politician
Ray Richards, US American football player
Raymond Richards (born 1987), Japanese American wakeboarder
Regina Richards, American singer
Renée Richards (born 1934), American tennis player
Rhys Richards, New Zealand historian and ethnographer
Richard N. Richards, American astronaut
Richard Walter Richards (1894–1986), Australian Antarctic explorer
Richard Watkins Richards (1863–1920), Lord Mayor of Sydney
Robert Richards (disambiguation), several people, including:
Robert L. Richards, American screenwriter
Ron Richards (disambiguation), several people
Rosalind Richards, Welsh television soap actress

S
Sandie Richards, Jamaican athlete
Sandra Richards, New Zealand netball player
Sanya Richards, American athlete
Solomon Richards (soldier) (died 1691), Irish soldier
Stan Richards, British actor
Stephen Richards (disambiguation), several people, including:
Stephen Richards (musician), (born 1977) vocalist and guitarist
Stephen Richards (politician), (1820–1894), Ontario, USA lawyer and politician
Stephen L. Richards, (1879–1959) American religious leader
Steve Richards (born 1960), British TV and radio political journalist and newspaper columnist
Steven Richards (born 1972), New Zealand racing driver
Stevie Richards (1971), ring name of the American wrestler Michael Manna
Sue Richards (artist) (1958–2014), Canadian artist

T
T. J. Richards, Australian coachbuilder whose company became Chrysler Australia Limited
Theodore Richards (disambiguation), several people, including:
Theodore Richards (convict), transported to Western Australia
Theodore William Richards, American chemist
Todd Richards (disambiguation), several people
Tony Richards (disambiguation), several people
Travis Richards, American ice-hockey player
Trevor Richards, several people
Trudy Richards (died 2008), American jazz singer

V
Vargrave Richards, Virgin Islands politician
Vernon Richards (1915–2001), Italian-British anarchist
Vincent Richards, American tennis player
Viv Richards, Antiguan cricketer

W
Wayne Richards, Australian rugby league footballer
Willard Richards, American LDS (Mormon) leader
William Richards (cricketer), South African cricketer
William A. Richards, American politician
William Buell Richards, Canadian judge
William Trost Richards, American painter

Z
Zalmon Richards, American educator

Fictional characters
Annie Douglas Richards, character from American TV soap opera Sunset Beach
Ben Richards, main character in the movie The Running Man (1987 film).
 Brendan Richards, character from K9 and Company
Franklin Richards (Fantastic Four), fictional character from the Fantastic Four
 Reed Richards, fictional character Fantastic Four
Sue Richards, fictional character from the Fantastic Four
Valeria Meghan Von Doom (née Richards), fictional character from the Fantastic Four

See also
Richard (surname)
Baron Milverton

References

English-language surnames
Patronymic surnames
Anglo-Cornish surnames